Boris Terral (born 8 November 1969) is a French actor. He appeared in more than forty films since 1992.

Selected filmography

References

External links 

1969 births
Living people
French male film actors
People from Saint-Denis, Seine-Saint-Denis
20th-century French male actors
21st-century French male actors